Badín is a village and municipality of the Banská Bystrica District in the Banská Bystrica Region of central Slovakia. It is situated 13 km from the town of Banská Bystrica.

Geography
The village lies at an altitude of 374 metres, but the altitude of the municipality ranges from 311 to 1,222 metres because it is partly situated in the Kremnické vrchy mountains. The municipality covers an area of 10.211 km².

Nature
Badín is best known for a primeval forest Badínsky prales, which is strictly protected by the state against any human activity since 1913. It has an area of 30.70 hectares and additional 23.75 hectares are protected as a buffer zone. Dominant tree species are fir (Abies alba), beech (Fagus sylvatica), maple (Acer pseudoplatanus), ash (Fraxinus excelsior), and elm (Ulmus glabra). On average, fir threes achieve an age of 350–400 years and beech trees 210–230 years in Badínsky prales. The biggest living fir tree is 46 m tall with a stem diameter of 148 cm. Several dead trees that have already fallen down are even bigger. The local fauna, still partially unexplored, includes red deer, roe deer, boar, brown bear, lynx, wild cat, fox, and marten.

History
In historical records, the village was first mentioned in 1293.https://library.hungaricana.hu/hu/view/KozMagyOkmanytarak_ArpadkoriOkmanytar_11/?query=badun&pg=276&layout=s From 1580 to 1657 it had to pay tributes to the Ottoman Empire. In 1588, it was besieged by Turks. A lignite mine existed near the village from 1892 to the beginning of the 20th century. In 1944, the local population joined the anti-Nazi Slovak National Uprising and Badín became the headquarters of the 2nd Czechoslovak paratrooper brigade.

Demographics
Badín has a population of 1,714 people (as of 2005). According to the 2001 census, the Slovak made 96% of the population, with a small percentage of Roma (1.7%) and Czechs (0.9%).

Genealogical resources

The records for genealogical research are available at the state archive "Statny Archiv in Banska Bystrica, Slovakia"

 Roman Catholic church records (births/marriages/deaths): 1725-1896 (parish A)
 Lutheran church records (births/marriages/deaths): 1761-1859 (parish B), 1860-1916 (parish A)
 Census records 1869 of Badin are not available at the state archive.

See also
 List of municipalities and towns in Slovakia

References

External links

 
Basic information about Badín 
Surnames of living people in Badin

Villages and municipalities in Banská Bystrica District